This is a list of the members of the Dewan Rakyat (House of Representatives) of the 9th Parliament of Malaysia, elected in 1995.

Composition

Elected members by state


Unless noted otherwise, the MPs served the entire term of the parliament (from 7 June 1995 until 10 November 1999).

Perlis

Kedah

Kelantan

Terengganu

Penang

Perak

Pahang

Selangor

Federal Territory of Kuala Lumpur

Negeri Sembilan

Malacca

Johor

Federal Territory of Labuan

Sabah

Sarawak

Notes

References

Abdullah, Z. G., Adnan, H. N., & Lee, K. H. (1997). Malaysia, tokoh dulu dan kini = Malaysian personalities, past and present. Kuala Lumpur, Malaysia: Penerbit Universiti Malaya.
Anzagain Sdn. Bhd. (2004). Almanak keputusan pilihan raya umum: Parlimen & Dewan Undangan Negeri, 1959-1999. Shah Alam, Selangor: Anzagain. 
Chin, U.-H. (1996). Chinese politics in Sarawak: A study of the Sarawak United People's Party. Kuala Lumpur: Oxford University Press.
Faisal, S. H. (2012). Domination and Contestation: Muslim Bumiputera Politics in Sarawak. Institute of Southeast Asian Studies.
Gomez, E. T. (1996). The 1995 Malaysian general elections: A report and commentary. Singapore: Institute of Southeast Asian Studies.

Malaysian parliaments
Lists of members of the Dewan Rakyat